Peter D. Kramer (born October 22, 1948) is an American psychiatrist and faculty member of Brown Medical School specializing in the area of clinical depression.

Early life
Peter D. Kramer was born on October 22, 1948, in New York City to Jewish Holocaust survivors. He graduated from Harvard University with a bachelor of arts degree in 1970 and an MD in 1976. He was a Marshall Scholar in literature at University College London in 1970-72.

Bibliography

Books
 Ordinarily Well: The Case for Antidepressants (2016)
 Freud: Inventor of the Modern Mind (2006)
 Against Depression (2005)
 Spectacular Happiness: A Novel (2001)
 Should You Leave?: A Psychiatrist Explores Intimacy and Autonomy—and the Nature of Advice (1997)
 Listening to Prozac (1993)
 Moments of Engagement: Intimate Psychotherapy in a Technological Age (1989)

Book introductions 
 The Art of Loving, by Erich Fromm
 On Becoming a Person, by Carl Rogers
 Better Than Well, by Carl Elliott
 The Therapist is the Therapy by L. B, Fierman

Articles 
 "Why Doctors Need Stories", The New York Times (2014)
 "In Defense of Antidepressants", The New York Times (2011)
 "The Valorization of Sadness" (from The Hastings Center Report) (2000)

Short fiction 
 "After Alice Left" TriQuarterly, #135/136 (2010)
 "The Name of the Helper", Prick of the Spindle (2010)
 "Permutations", Summerset Review (2011)

References

External links 
 Official site

1948 births
Living people
20th-century American Jews
21st-century American Jews
Alumni of University College London
American health and wellness writers
American psychiatrists
American science writers
Brown University faculty
Harvard Medical School alumni
Harvard University alumni
Marshall Scholars